Shanmuganathan Shanugeeth (born 28 February 1998) is a Sri Lankan cricketer. He made his List A debut for Matara District in the 2016–17 Districts One Day Tournament on 22 March 2017.

References

External links
 

1998 births
Living people
Sri Lankan cricketers
Matara District cricketers
Sportspeople from Kandy